Sheykh Hanush (also Romanized as Sheykh Ḩanūsh; also known as Dabbāt Zeynab and Zeynab) is a village in Ben Moala Rural District, in the Central District of Shush County, Khuzestan Province, Iran. At the 2006 census, its population was 278, in 43 families.

References 

Populated places in Shush County